Kachuga (roofed turtles) is an obsolete genus formerly used for several species of Asian turtles, now placed in Batagur and Pangshura:

 Batagur dhongoka – three-striped roofed turtle
 Batagur kachuga – red-crowned roofed turtle
 Batagur trivittata – Burmese roofed turtle
 Pangshura smithii – brown roofed turtle
 Pangshura sylhetensis – Assam roofed turtle
 Pangshura tecta – Indian roofed turtle
 Pangshura tentoria – Indian tent turtle

Obsolete animal taxa
Geoemydidae
Batagur
Pangshura